Aarón Bueno Gómez (born 21 August 1983) is a Spanish footballer who plays as a left winger.

Football career
Born in Sabadell, Barcelona, Catalonia, Bueno started his career with UDA Gramenet. He played his first nine seasons as a senior in Segunda División B, also representing Atlético Levante UD, CD Atlético Baleares, AD Ceuta, Cádiz CF and CE Sabadell FC; he made his debut in Segunda División with the latter, his first appearance in the competition being on 27 August 2011 in a 2–1 home win against SD Huesca.

At the end of the campaign, Bueno's contract was not renewed and he signed with Real Oviedo in early August 2012 in a return to the third level. However, a week later, he cut ties with the club due to personal reasons, moving to fellow league side Gimnàstic de Tarragona the same month.

On 26 June 2013, Bueno was released by Nàstic. On 11 August, he signed with Salamanca AC also in the third tier; after the latter's dissolution, he moved to UE Sant Andreu still in the third division.

On 22 July 2014, Bueno joined third level's CD Toledo.

Personal life
Aarón's older brother, Nakor, was also a footballer. A forward, he spent most of his career with UE Lleida.

References

External links

Stats and bio at Cadistas1910 

1983 births
Living people
Sportspeople from Sabadell
Spanish footballers
Footballers from Catalonia
Association football wingers
Segunda División players
Segunda División B players
Tercera División players
UDA Gramenet footballers
Atlético Levante UD players
CD Atlético Baleares footballers
AD Ceuta footballers
Cádiz CF players
CE Sabadell FC footballers
Gimnàstic de Tarragona footballers
UE Sant Andreu footballers
CD Toledo players
Terrassa FC footballers
FC Santboià players
CF Gavà players
Catalonia international footballers